Ramon Fernández Vidal (born 19 September 1969), known as Moncho Fernández, is a Spanish basketball manager and the current coach of Monbus Obradoiro of the Liga ACB. He is nicknamed as The Alchemist.

Coaching career
Fernández started his coaching career with Moncho López as the assistant coach of Gijón Baloncesto in 2000. After the relegation of the club from Liga ACB in the 2001–02, he took the lead of the club during the next two seasons.

In 2005, Fernández came back to Liga ACB, again as assistant of Moncho López, this time to Leche Río Breogán. He left the club after a new relegation, for joining CB Villa de Los Barrios, of the LEB Oro league, as head coach. He qualified the Andalusians to a LEB Oro Final Four in 2009. Just after being defeated in the semifinals, the club would be dissolved and consequently, López left it.

In 2009, Fernández debuted in ACB with CB Murcia, but he would be sacked in December 2009, after earning only two wins in eleven games.

After one year without managing any team, on 2 July 2010, Moncho Fernández signed with his home city team Obradoiro CAB. In his first season, he promoted the Galician team to the Liga ACB after winning the 2011 LEB Oro Playoffs.

Fernández qualified Obradoiro for the 2013 ACB Playoffs, but was eliminated in the first round by Real Madrid.

Honours
Copa Príncipe de Asturias: (1)
2011

References

External links
Profile at ACB.com

1969 births
Living people
Spanish basketball coaches
Liga ACB head coaches
Sportspeople from Santiago de Compostela
Gijón Baloncesto coaches